Julien Haelterman (born 2 May 1940) is a Belgian racing cyclist. He rode in the 1965 Tour de France.

References

1940 births
Living people
Belgian male cyclists
Place of birth missing (living people)
20th-century Belgian people